Aartsenia is a genus of sea snails, marine gastropod mollusks in the family Pyramidellidae, the pyrams and their allies.

Description
The species in this genus are very large compared to the Odostomias, looking like inflated Odostomias. Their  sculpture consists of very fine lines of growth and still finer wavy closely placed spiral striations.

Distribution
The vast majority of the genus's distribution is in the Northern Sea near the coasts of Iceland and Scandinavian countries such as Norway, Sweden and Denmark, near the Arctic Circle.

Species
Species within the genus Aartsenia include:
 Aartsenia arctica (Dall & Bartsch, 1909)
 Aartsenia candida (Møller, 1842)
 Aartsenia japonica (A. Adams, 1860)
 Aartsenia martensi (Dall & Bartsch, 1906)
 Aartsenia sagamiensis Kuroda & Habe, 1971

References

Pyramidellidae